The Cootamundra Herald also published as The Cootamundra Daily Herald is a bi-weekly English language newspaper published in Cootamundra, New South Wales, Australia.

Newspaper history 

The Cootamundra Herald, subtitled Murrumburrah, Bethungra and Bland Advertiser, was founded by Thomas Campbell Brown (c. 1855 – 7 April 1936) and Frederick Pinkstone (1847 – 2 January 1922) and first published on 30 January 1877. Brown, a friend of Pinkstone for even longer than they were business partners, left for Sydney in 1883, and Pinkstone continued as editor until 1916, when he was forced to retire due to illness. He called on his son William Henry to take over the editorship which he did until the age of 75 and held the ownership until his death at 78. William Henry's son Harry Pinkstone then inherited the paper and edited it for five years before his own death at the age of 48. Harry Pinkstone's widow eventually sold the newspaper to the Bradley family in 1963. On 2 October 1990 the Bradley family sold the newspaper to Rural Press Limited which merged with  Fairfax in 2007.

Barry Clarke was the longest standing editor of The Cootamundra Herald, a position he held from approximately 1965-1997. He was known for his strong editorial and campaigning for the benefits of the community.

Between approximately 1946 and 1954 the newspaper issued in a daily frequency and was briefly titled Cootamundra Daily Herald.

More recently it was published twice weekly (Wednesday and Friday) both on-line and as hard copy until 17 March 2020, when the printed version was suspended, initially for three months, attributable to the economic decline that attended the COVID-19 pandemic.

Competition
In August 1882 the Cootamundra Liberal was founded, for many years owned by Edwin Doidge, father of Frederick W. Doidge.
In 1928, shortly after being renamed the Cootamundra Daily News, the paper was purchased from its proprietor, William John Bright (c. 1886 – c. 1 April 1966), by the Herald, and discontinued.
The Liberal and the Herald have been confused by commentators.

Digitisation 
The paper has been digitised as part of the Australian Newspapers Digitisation Program project of the National Library of Australia.

See also
 List of newspapers in Australia
 List of newspapers in New South Wales

References

External links
Cootamundra Herald website
 
 

Newspapers established in 1880
Newspapers published in New South Wales
Newspapers on Trove